Meltdown (also known as American Meltdown) is a 2004 American action thriller television film directed by Jeremiah S. Chechik and written by Larry and Paul Barber.  The film stars Bruce Greenwood, Leslie Hope, and Arnold Vosloo, and depicts a terrorist takeover of the San Onofre Nuclear Generating Station a nuclear power plant in Southern California. It aired on FX on June 6, 2004.

Cast
 Bruce Greenwood as Agent Tom Shea
 Leslie Hope as Zoe Cox
 Arnold Vosloo as Khalid / Sands
 James Remar as Colonel Boggs
 Susan Merson as Attorney General Zutrow
 Will Lyman as Homeland Chief Utley
 Bill Mondy as FBI Agent Tucci
 Brent Stait as FBI Commander Hall
 Adrian Holmes as Agent Charlie Jansen
 Manoj Sood as Syed Kahn
 Tony Alcantar as Reactor Tech Chuck Pasquin
 Diego Diablo Del Mar as Marwan / Raul (as Diego Del Mar)
 Alessandro Juliani as Salem / Emmett
 Darren Shahlavi as Waleed / Frank
 David Neale as Shafig / Jesse

External links

2004 films
2004 action thriller films
2004 science fiction action films
2000s English-language films
2000s Arabic-language films
2000s science fiction thriller films
Action television films
American action thriller films
American science fiction action films
American science fiction television films
American science fiction thriller films
American thriller television films
Films about the Federal Bureau of Investigation
Films about nuclear accidents and incidents
Films about terrorism in the United States
Films directed by Jeremiah S. Chechik
Films scored by Tomandandy
Films set in California
FX Networks original films
2000s American films